Tommy Egan (née Thomas Patrick Teresi), portrayed by Joseph Sikora, is a fictional character from the Starz television series, Power and spin-offs, Book II and Book IV. He is a convicted drug dealer from Jamaica, Queens and the only character (played by Joseph Sikora) to star three out of four shows (original series and its sequels, excluding the prequel, Book III) in the Power Universe.

Storyline

Power

Power Book II: Ghost

Season 1 
Tasha St. Patrick pinned the murder of James on Tommy to protect her son, thus making it a priority of the feds to arrest him.
 
Tasha went to see Monet Tejada (Mary J. Blige) in a warehouse to buy her son Tariq (Michael Rainey Jr.) out of the game completely, when they were busy discussing there was a shoot out at the warehouse, after the cost was clear, Tasha looked out the and saw a blue Mustang which is Tommy's signature car. Tasha realized Tommy has returned and is after her for wrongfully framing him.

Later that night Tariq went to see Tommy to negotiate a peace treaty but Tommy was so fixated on killing Tasha for the murder of his late girlfriend, Lakeisha Grant (Lala Anthony), pinning the murder of Ghost (Omari Hardwick) on him, and for ratting on his organization and his whole operation to the feds. He has also cut ties with Tariq by stating they stopped being family when he killed Ghost.

Tommy stole his mother's BMW and followed Tasha with no knowledge that the federal agents led by Copper Saxe (Shane Johnson) were watching his every move. After a lengthy chase, he supposedly drove into a petrol filling station and his car exploded. 

Tariq received a phone call and apparently Tommy Egan was not dead but very much alive, him and Tariq orchestrated the fabrication of his death so he can hide from the law enforcement. When Tariq went to link up with his mother in the graveyard, he already dropped a notice to the police that Tommy was closing in on Tasha, the police took Tasha into witness protection where Tommy could not find her, after the police left, out of Tommy came out and strangled Tariq but Monet came in early to save the day as she had Tommy at gun point but they let him go.

Power Book IV: Force

Season 1 
With New York thinking him dead, Tommy heads for California, where an associate is waiting. However, he heads to Chicago for pit stop and discovers his grandmother is still alive and that he has an older half-brother named JP. After a series of events occur, Tommy takes a liking to the city of Chicago and tells his associate to find someone else because he has decided to make Chicago his new base of operations.

Tommy bumped into an old employee Liliana (Audrey Esparza) who believed he was there to kill her but after a fight, they realize it was coincidence that brought them together. He then recruits her to working for him, once discovering that she has been dealing in the city.

He later recruits a young gangster named D-Mac, only to later learn that he is his nephew from JP.

Appearances

References

External links 
  
  
 

Fictional mass murderers
Fictional drug dealers
Fictional gangsters
Fictional American people
Television characters introduced in 2014
Fictional left-handed character